The Social Democrat Party was a short-lived social democratic political party in the Ottoman Empire, founded in the aftermath of the First World War. Notable members included Mehmet Esat Işık, Ata Atalay, Osman Nuri Eralp, Samipaşazade Sezai, Hamdi Bey, Yorgaki Efendi, Ubeydullah Bey, and Besim Ömer Akalın.

References

1918 establishments in the Ottoman Empire
Political parties in the Ottoman Empire
1919 disestablishments in the Ottoman Empire